Kenneth Street may refer to:

 Kenneth Street (jurist) (1890–1972), Australian jurist
 Kenneth Street Jr. (1920–2006), American chemist